Aghvani is a village in the Kapan Municipality of the Syunik Province in Armenia.

Etymology 
The village was previously known as Khoghvani.

Demographics 
Statistical Committee of Armenia reported Agarak's population as 88 in 2010, down from 138 at the 2001 census.

References 

Populated places in Syunik Province